Five Mile Plains is a community in the Canadian province of Nova Scotia, located in the Municipal District of West Hants.

References
Five Mile Plains on Destination Nova Scotia

Communities in Hants County, Nova Scotia
Black Canadian settlements
General Service Areas in Nova Scotia